Vermont Route 235 (VT 235) is a  state-numbered highway in Franklin County, Vermont, United States. It runs from VT 120 in Franklin northwest to the Morses Line Border Crossing near the village of Morses Line, where it crosses into Quebec, Canada, and connects to Quebec Route 235, from which it derives its number. The entire route is town-maintained and internally designated as major collector 299.  Locally, the route is known as Morses Line Road.

Route description
VT 235 begins in the south at VT 120 in the town of Franklin. Here, VT 235 meets the northern terminus of VT 207 and then turns directly north and crosses the border into Quebec, where it meets Quebec Route 235 in Saint-Armand.

Major intersections

References

External links

235
Transportation in Franklin County, Vermont